Michael "Mike" Kurt (born 2 April 1980) is a Swiss slalom canoeist who competed at the international level from 1996 to 2016.

He won a gold medal in the K1 team event at the 2003 ICF Canoe Slalom World Championships in Augsburg. He also won four medals at the European Championships (1 gold, 1 silver and 2 bronzes).

At the 2004 Summer Olympics Kurt competed in the K1 event. He won the qualification round, and progressed to the semifinals. However, at this stage, he finished 20th out of 25. At the 2008 Summer Olympics he finished seventeenth in the qualification round of the K1 event, failing to progress to the semifinals. At the 2012 Summer Olympics he placed 13th in the K1 event after being eliminated in the semifinals.

He lives in Solothurn and is a co-founder and CEO of the crowdfunding platform www.ibelieveinyou.ch.

World Cup individual podiums

1 Pan American Championship counting for World Cup points

References

External links

1980 births
Living people
Canoeists at the 2004 Summer Olympics
Canoeists at the 2008 Summer Olympics
Canoeists at the 2012 Summer Olympics
Olympic canoeists of Switzerland
Swiss male canoeists
Medalists at the ICF Canoe Slalom World Championships
Sportspeople from the canton of Bern